Lestek (also Leszek, Lestko) was the second duke of Polans, and son of Siemowit, born c. 870–880, mentioned in the oldest Polish chronicle, Gesta principum Polonorum by Gallus Anonimus. The dukes of Polans were the foundation of the Piast dynasty, the first historical ruling dynasty of Poland.

Initially, no-one doubted the historicity of Lestek. In the second half of the nineteenth century, however, his existence began to be questioned. The issue was basically settled thanks to an article written by Henryk Łowmiański, in which he came out in favor of the credibility of Gallus Anonymus's account, and thus in favor of the historicity of the three direct predecessors to Mieszko. This view is dominant in the Polish historiography.

The origin of his name is not known, but it can be derived from the old Polish word lście which means "crafty". It is believed this is a diminutive of the Slavic name Lścimir or Lścisław. The number and existence of Lestek's wives or consorts are unknown. A theory by Stanisław Zakrzewski claims Lestek (or Lestko) could have been married to a Moravian princess. Another theory (inferred from the descriptions of a Belgian chronicler from the 14th century) is that a Saxon princess could have been Lestek's wife and that they had a son, Ewraker, later the Bishop of Liège. Lestko's son, Siemomysł, was the next ruler of the Polish state.

References

Bibliography
 
 
 
 
 

9th-century Polish monarchs
10th-century Polish monarchs
Piast dynasty
870s births
10th-century deaths
Year of birth uncertain
Year of death uncertain
Dukes of Poland
9th-century Slavs
Slavic pagans